Roger Cartín (born 2 April 1957) is a Costa Rican sports shooter. He competed at the 1980 Summer Olympics and the 1984 Summer Olympics.

References

1957 births
Living people
Costa Rican male sport shooters
Olympic shooters of Costa Rica
Shooters at the 1980 Summer Olympics
Shooters at the 1984 Summer Olympics
Sportspeople from San José, Costa Rica